Fillrate or fill rate can refer to:

 Fillrate, a measure of graphics performance
 Service rate, a logistics measure of ordering performance
 Fill rate, a logistics measure of inventory effectiveness at meeting demands

Rates